Liang Jing (March 1990 – 22 May 2021) was a Chinese ultramarathon runner; he died in the Gansu ultramarathon disaster.

Liang won several ultramarathons, including the Ultra Gobi—a  race through the Gobi Desert—in 2018. He died on 22 May 2021, at the age of 31, when high winds and freezing rain struck a long-distance race in Baiyin, Gansu, China. Twenty other runners died in the tragedy.

He was nicknamed "Liang God" and "General Liang" and was considered "one of China's most accomplished ultramarathoners".

See also
 Huang Guanjun, another champion runner who died in the Gansu ultramarathon

References

1990 births
2021 deaths
Chinese male marathon runners
Place of birth missing
Sport deaths in China